Licornia peltata is a species of gymnolaematan bryozoans (sea mats) first described from the Queensland coast. Originally placed in Scrupocellaria, it has now been accepted within Licornia.

References

Further reading
Badve, R. M., and M. A. Sonar. "Some fossil neocheilostomine bryozoans from the Holocene of the west coast of Maharashtra and Goa, India." Jour. Palaeontol. Soc. India 42 (1997): 35-48.
GORDON, Dennis. "Bryozoa of New Caledonia." Compendium of marine species of New Caledonia. Documents scientifiques et techniques (2006): 157-168.
Vieira, Leandro M., et al. "Evidence for polyphyly of the genus Scrupocellaria (Bryozoa: Candidae) based on a phylogenetic analysis of morphological characters." PLoS ONE 9.4 (2014): e95296.
Vieira, Leandro M., et al. "Evidence for polyphyly of the genus Scrupocellaria (Bryozoa: Candidae) based on a phylogenetic analysis of morphological characters." PLoS ONE 9.4 (2014): e95296.

External links

Animals described in 2012
Cheilostomatida